Kennelia is a genus of moths belonging to the subfamily Olethreutinae of the family Tortricidae.

Species
Kennelia albifacies (Walsingham, in Swinhoe, 1900)
Kennelia apiconcava Zhang & Wang, 2006
Kennelia protocyma (Meyrick, 1936)
Kennelia tropica Razowski, 2009
Kennelia xylinana (Kennel, 1900)

See also
List of Tortricidae genera

References

External links
tortricidae.com

Eucosmini
Tortricidae genera